The women's shot put at the 2011 IPC Athletics World Championships was held at the QEII Stadium from 22–29 January.

Medalists

F11
The Women's shot put, F11 was held on January 26

F11 = visual impairment: may range from no light perception in either eye to light perception with the inability to recognise the shape of a hand at any distance or in any direction.

Results

Final

Key:  CR = Championship Record, SB = Season Best

F12
The Women's shot put, F12 was held on January 26

F12 = visual impairment: may have the ability to recognise the shape of a hand, have a visual acuity of 2/60 and/or visual field of less than 5 degrees.

Results

Final

F20
The Women's shot put, F20 was held on January 28

F20 = intellectual disability.

Results

Final

Key:  SB = Season Best, NM = No Mark

F32/33/34
The Women's shot put, F32/33/34 was held on January 23 with the medal ceremony on January 24

F32/33/34:
F32 = poor functional strength in arms, legs and trunk, able to propel a wheelchair, compete in a wheelchair and may throw a club or discus from a throwing frame. 
F33 = some degree of trunk movement when pushing a wheelchair, forward trunk movement is limited during forceful pushing, throwing movements are mainly from the arm, compete in a wheelchair or from a throwing frame.
F34 = good functional strength with minimal limitation or control problems in the arms or trunk, compete in a wheelchair or from a throwing frame.

Results

Final

Key:  WR = World Record, =CR = Equal Championship Record, AR = Area Record, SB = Season Best

F35/36
The Women's shot put, F35/36 was held on January 27 with the medal ceremony on January 28

F35/36:
F35 = good static balance, problems in dynamic balance, may need assistive devices for walking but not when standing or throwing, may have sufficient lower extremity function to execute a run up when throwing. 
F36 = walk without assistance or assistive devices, have more control problems with upper than lower limbs. All four limbs are involved, dynamic often better than static balance. Hand control, grasp and release are affected when throwing.

Results

Final

Key:  WR = World Record, SB = Season Best

F37
The Women's shot put, F37 was held on January 24 with the medal ceremony on January 25

F37 = spasticity in an arm and leg on the same side, good functional ability on the non impaired side, better development, good arm and hand control and follow through.

Results

Final

Key:  CR = Championship Record, SB = Season Best, AR = Area Record

F40
The Women's shot put, F40 was held on January 23

F40 =  dwarfism.

Tunisia's Raoua Tlili took the gold medal, China's Menggenjimisu the silver, while the Moroccan sisters Laila El Garaa and Najat El Garaa placed 3rd and 4th at the event.

Results

Final

Key:  CR = Championship Record, SB = Season Best, AR = Area Record

F42/44/46
The Women's shot put, F42/44/46 was held on January 22

F42/44/46:
F42 = single above knee amputation or equivalent impairments. 
F44 = single below knee amputation or equivalent impairments.
F46 = single above or below elbow amputation or equivalent impairments.

Results

Final

Key:  CR = Championship Record, AR = Asian Record

F52/53
The Women's shot put, F52/53 was held on January 23

F52/53:
F52 = good shoulder, elbow and wrist function, poor to normal finger flexion and extension, no trunk or leg function. 
F53 = normal upper limb function, no abdominal, leg or lower spinal function.

Results

Final

Key:  CR = Championship Record

F54/55/56
The Women's shot put, F54/55/56 was held on January 29

F54/55/56:
F54 = normal upper limb function, no abdominal or lower spinal function. 
F55 = normal upper limb function, may have partial to almost completely normal trunk function, no leg function.
F56 = normal upper limb and trunk function, some leg function, high bilateral above knee amputation.

Results

Final

Key:  CR = Championship Record, SB = Season Best

F57/58
The Women's shot put, F57/58 was held on January 23

F57/58:
F57 = normal upper limb and trunk function, may have bilateral above knee amputations. 
F58 = normal upper limb and trunk function, a bilateral below knee amputation or single above knee amputation.

Results

Final

Key:  WR = World Record, AR = Asian Record

See also
List of IPC world records in athletics

References
General
Schedule and results, Official site of the 2011 IPC Athletics World Championships
IPC Athletics Classification Explained, Scottish Disability Sport
Specific

Shot put
2011 in women's athletics
Shot put at the World Para Athletics Championships